Jean-Pierre Boccara is a French-Italian-American nightclub and restaurant entrepreneur and artist known for founding several seminal clubs in Los Angeles, California. Lhasa Club, Lhasaland, Café Largo, and Luna Park were known for bookings across many genres including music, spoken word, comedy, cinema, cabaret, and pre-digital media art shows. These venues received critical acclaim not only for their range of groundbreaking acts, but also for their cuisine and ambiance.

Early life 

Born in Tunisia and raised in Paris, Boccara first came to Los Angeles in 1976 as a film student.

The Clubs

Lhasa Club (1982–1988) in Hollywood 

The three hundred person capacity multimedia space functioned as a stage, art gallery, cinema, special events venue, and café. The club was known for its eclectic and surprising bookings of original talent. Named by the LA Weekly "Best after hours hangout" in 1982,  "Best avant-garde club" in 1983, and "Best cabaret" in 1984, the club was often covered in media outlets including KCRW, LA Weekly and the LA Times. The Lhasa Club emphasized visuals, film loops, slide shows, and handmade special effects.

It became a watering hole for both unknown and established artists, not only in all genres of music but also spoken word, comedy, cinema, cabaret, and painting. Some of the artists who appeared on Lhasa's stage where Ann Magnuson, Henry Rollins, Sandra Bernhard, Jane's Addiction, Hubert Selby Jr., Nick Cave, Duran Duran, Christian Death, Kevin Costner, Exene Cervenka, Chris Isaak, Joey Arias, Thomas Dolby, The Kipper Kids, John Sex, Lypsinka, Lance Loud, The Fibonaccis, Freshly Wrapped Candies, Lydia Lunch, Angie Bowie, John Lurie, John Fleck, Stray Cats, Llyn Foulkes, Jello Biafra, and Rachel Rosenthal.

In 1984, a live album entitled The Lives of Lhasa was produced by Boccara, Anna Mariani, and David Yuratich. It featured among others, Henry Rollins, The Fibonaccis, and Linda J. Albertano.

In 1987, Boccara began a film of one hundred performers performing short pieces in front of a single camera. Only about a third of the project was completed. Final edited footage was released in 2015 as The Lhasa Club Tapes on the Lhasa Largo LunaPark page on YouTube and Lhasa Largo LunaPark on Facebook.

In 1988, Boccara established the Lhasa Foundation, a non-profit arts group.

Lhasaland (1988–1989) at the Musician's Union in Hollywood 

The one thousand person capacity, multimedia two-level concert/party hall presented major national acts including Devo, The Knitters and Depeche Mode. Music and film industry parties included the L.A. Weekly 10th anniversary party.

Café Largo (1989–1992), on Fairfax in Hollywood 

The 120 seat critically acclaimedclub and restaurant featured comedy, jazz, world music, spoken word, live music and record industry showcases.  In 1990, the LA Reader said "Largo mixes food and music memorably" and the LA Weekly named it the "Best Supper Club" in 1991. It was sold in 1992 and operated until 2008.

The talent roster included comedians Nora Dunn, Lotus Weinstock, and Sharon Barr; singers Victoria Williams, The Del Rubio Triplets, Suzanne Vega, Peter Himmelman, Grant Lee Buffalo and Joe Higgs; cabaret performers Weba Garretson, Lypsinka, Philip Littell, Stephanie Vlahos, The Les Stevens Show; and spoken word artists Henry Rollins, Barry Yourgrau, Wanda Coleman, and Timothy Leary.

For three years, Largo hosted the weekly series Poetry in Motion, presented by Eve Brandstein and Michael Lally. Anna Mariani co-managed the Lhasa Club, Lhasaland and Café Largo.

Luna Park (1993–2000) in West Hollywood 

The seven hundred person capacity multi-level nightclub featured two stages with live entertainment, dancing, and a global cuisine restaurant.  Cited for "Triple the ambiance" (Daily News, 1994), "Best food in Los Angeles" (Buzz, 1995), "Best food in a nightclub" (L.A. Weekly 1998), "The best nightspot in town, with a great Euro-Asian menu..."(Travel and Leisure 1998), and "Possibly the best music club on the planet" (Los Angeles Magazine, 1999). The LA Times coverage and reviews of the performances were extensive.

Some of the acts included:

 Pop/Rock : Alanis Morissette, Beck, Debbie Harry, Donovan, JJ Cale, Jeff Buckley, Mare Winningham, Milla Jovovich, Michael Penn, John Doe, Radiohead, Richie Havens, Sheryl Crow, Sneaker Pimps, Angela McCluskey and The Wild Colonials, Pink Martini, Ozomatli, Jonathan Richman, Lucinda Williams, Dave Davis, Meredith Brooks, Steve Wynn
 World Music: Cesaria Evora, Angelique Kidjo, Flaco Jimenez, Waldemar Bastos, Ricardo Lemvo, Trilok Gurtu, Jai Uttal, Korla Pandit
 Jazz/RnB: Bobby Brown, Chaka Khan, Teena Marie, Rick James, LL Cool J, Fishbone, Branford Marsalis, Jody Watley, MC Solaar, Me'shell NdegeOcello, Brand New Heavies, The Meters, Morcheeba, Cassandra Wilson, Dionne Farris, John Lurie
 Cabaret: Karen Black, John Fleck, Alexis Arquette, Jackie Beat, Joey Arias, Ann Magnuson, Estelle Reiner, Astrid Hadad
 Comedy and Spoken Word: Roseanne, Ellen DeGeneres, Judd Apatow, Rudy Ray Moore, LaWanda Page, Julie Halston, Dana Gould, Patton Oswalt, Timothy Leary, Lydia Lunch and Henry Rollins, who recorded the DVD Henry Rollins - Live in Luna Park featuring Henry Rollins VS Iggy Pop.

During its seven years span Luna Park hosted Beth Lapides' Uncabaret. The weekly unconventional comedy show showcased the talents of Margaret Cho, Andy Dick, Andy Kindler, Taylor Negron, Bobcat Goldthwait, Julia Sweeney, Janeane Garofalo, Bob Odenkirk and Kathy Griffin.

References

Living people
Nightclub owners
American restaurateurs
French emigrants to the United States
American filmmakers
Nightclubs in Los Angeles County, California
Former music venues in California
Year of birth missing (living people)